The William Leon Garrett Fieldhouse (previously called The Fieldhouse) is an on-campus gymnasium used for intramural sports at Indiana University in Bloomington, Indiana. It was formerly the home of the Indiana Hoosiers men's basketball team.

Current use
Today the Fieldhouse, now called the William Leon Garrett Fieldhouse, has several rows of basketball courts. Because it is attached to the former School of Health, Physical Education & Recreation (HPER) it was referred to as the "hyper."  As of 2012, the Indiana University School of HPER has been renamed the School of Public Health-Bloomington.

In 2010, a women's locker room was added and the men's and faculty/staff locker rooms underwent renovations. On July 5, 2011 a roof fire caused major damage to the facility estimated to cost $3 million. As a result, substantial repairs replacements were made to the damaged section of the roof, courts and track, lights, and windows. It did not re-open until the summer of 2012.

History
The Fieldhouse was built adjacent to the Men's Gymnasium as a venue to host the Indiana Hoosiers men's basketball team, whose popularity had outgrown the previous gymnasium. The basketball team first played in the Fieldhouse for the 1928–29 season. It served as the state of Indiana's first true basketball stadium and was considered one of the classic venues in college basketball during its time.

The Fieldhouse could seat up to 8,000 spectators and was later extended to seat 10,000. It provided extensive lighting on the floor and baskets, and also featured a center court press box that could seat 35 journalists and had 10 built-in telegraph wires. It originally cost $350,000 and was paid for with construction bonds and a $2.00 fee levied against each Indiana University student.

The first game at the facility was held on December 8, 1928 when the Hoosiers face the Washington Bears and lost 31–30. However, the dedication game for the Fieldhouse on December 13, 1928 saw a 34–26 victory over the Pennsylvania Quakers team. The dedication game was a sold-out gala that included Indiana Governor-elect Harry Leslie and Big Ten Conference Commissioner John L. Griffith.

Indiana star player (and later coach) Branch McCracken scored the first point in the facility with a free throw. McCracken went on to earn All-American honors the following season. He returned in the 1938–39 season to succeed Everett Dean as coach of the men's basketball team. The facility saw six perfect seasons including a 24-game unbeaten home winning streak from 1938 to 1941. During the 1940s and 1950s McCracken's fast-breaking teams would earn the nickname "Hurryin' Hoosiers".

Throughout the facility's tenure as home to the men's basketball team, the Fieldhouse hosted two national championship teams - in the 1939-40 and 1952-53 seasons - and five conference titles. The Hoosiers compiled a 234–74 record in the facility. Besides the two national titles, it was the home of five Big Ten Conference Championships, 20 All-Americans, 17 All-Big Ten First Team selections and three Big Ten Most Valuable Players.

The final game was played on February 29, 1960 by an Indiana squad led by Walt Bellamy that defeated Big Ten champions Ohio State in a 99–83 victory (Ohio State went on to win the national championship). The basketball team moved out in 1960 to the "New" IU Fieldhouse before moving into the current home, now known as Simon Skjodt Assembly Hall, in 1971.

The sports facility had been formerly named "Wildermuth Intramural Center" after Ora Wildermuth, a former university trustee who held "extraordinarily strong opposition to racial integration". However, the school announced four days later that it would not implement the change due to lack of support from Garrett's family. Eventually, in 2018, Wildermuth's name was stripped from the facility, and the trustees renamed the facility "Intramural Center".

The facility was renamed to honor former IU All-American Bill Garrett in 2020.

References

External links
 2005-06 IU Hoosiers Men's Basketball Media Guide
 

Sports venues in Indiana
Defunct college basketball venues in the United States
Indiana Hoosiers basketball venues
1928 establishments in Indiana